Glenn Gordon (born 1957) is a British billionaire businessman, the chairman of William Grant & Sons and a descendant of the company's founder, William Grant.

Biography 
His family’s wealth grew by over £200 million after profits at the William Grant & Sons distillery increased to £260.2 million in 2016/17.

According to the 2020 Sunday Times Rich List, Gordon was estimated to be worth £3.186 billion, an increase of £304 million from 2019.

He resides in Jersey.

Early life
Gordon is the great-great grandson of company founder William Grant.

Career
Gordon was managing director of William Grant & Sons from 1992 to 1999, and chairman since 2012, when he succeeded Peter Gordon, who had been chairman since 2008.

References

Living people
British billionaires
British chief executives
1957 births
William Grant & Sons people
Businesspeople from Glasgow